The Adaja is a river of Spain located in the centre of the Iberian Peninsula, a major left-bank tributary of the Douro. Featuring a total length of 163 km, its river basin drains an area of 5,328 km2.

Initially following a Southwest-Northeast course through the Amblés Valley, the Adaja bends towards the North in Ávila. It receives the contribution of its most important tributary, the Eresma, near Matapozuelos, emptying in the Douro in the province of Valladolid near the town of Aniago.

References 

 
Tributaries of the Douro River